The city of Guwahati has about eight Kendriya Vidyalaya schools in the city and its vicinity. KV CRPF is located inside the CRPF Group Centre at Amerigog on Guwahati-Shillong Road (known as 9th Mile). The school was opened to serve the children of CRPF employees who have a frequently transferable job. The school also serves people from outside the CRPF community.

The school was established in 1981 and has now grown to more than a thousand students. The school has 3 sections each from class I to Xth while the +2 level has three streams - Arts, Commerce and Science (PCM and PCB). Just like all other KVs, it strictly follows the CBSE guidelines, curriculum and calendar.

See also
List of Kendriya Vidyalaya schools

External links
 Homepage

Kendriya Vidyalayas
Schools in Guwahati
1981 establishments in Assam
Educational institutions established in 1981